"Composed upon Westminster Bridge, September 3, 1802" is a Petrarchan sonnet by William Wordsworth describing London and the River Thames, viewed from Westminster Bridge in the early morning. It was first published in the collection Poems, in Two Volumes in 1807.

History

The sonnet was originally dated 1803, but this was corrected in later editions and the date of composition given precisely as 31 July 1802, when Wordsworth and his sister Dorothy were travelling to Calais to visit Annette Vallon and his daughter Caroline by Annette, prior to his forthcoming marriage to Mary Hutchinson.

The sonnet has always been popular, escaping the generally excoriating reviews from critics such as Francis Jeffrey in the Edinburgh Review when Poems in Two Volumes was first published. The reason undoubtedly lies in its great simplicity and beauty of language, turning on Dorothy's observation that this man-made spectacle is nevertheless one to be compared to nature's grandest natural spectacles. Cleanth Brooks analysed the sonnet in these terms in The Well Wrought Urn: Studies in the Structure of Poetry.

Stephen Gill remarks that at the end of his life Wordsworth, engaged in editing his works, contemplated a revision even of "so perfect a poem" as this sonnet in response to an objection from a lady that London could not both be "bare" and "clothed" (an example of the use of paradox in literature).

That the sonnet so closely follows Dorothy's journal entry comes as no surprise because Dorothy wrote her Grasmere Journal to "give Wm pleasure by it" and it was freely available to Wordsworth, who said of Dorothy that "She gave me eyes, she gave me ears" in his poem "The Sparrow's Nest".

References

Sources

Further reading
 Davies, Hunter. William Wordsworth, Weidenfeld and Nicolson, 1980
 Wilson, Frances. The Ballad of Dorothy Wordsworth, Faber and Faber, 2008

External links

 Poems: In Two Volumes by William Wordsworth. Longman, Hurst, Rees, and Orme, 1807
 The Well Wrought Urn: Studies in the Structure of Poetry by Cleanth Brooks and Paul Rand. Harcourt, Brace 1975 
 "Review of Poems, in Two Volumes by Francis Jeffrey, in Edinburgh Review, pp. 214–231, vol. XI, October 1807 – January 1808

1802 poems
1807 poems
Poetry by William Wordsworth
Sonnets
Poems about cities
Works about London
Culture associated with the River Thames